Abkhazia (region in Georgia) is a cultural region in the South Caucasus. It has a long history of wine-making. Most of the produced wine is consumed locally or exported to Russia.

Varieties
Abkhazian wine varieties include:

White
Anakopia is a white semi-dry table wine made from the Tsolikauri grape variety grown in the Sukhumi and Gudauta districts in Abkhazia. The colour range is from light to dark-straw. It has a specific aroma and a subtle fresh taste. The alcohol content in the ready wine is 9-11%, sugar content 1-2 g/100 mL, titrated acidity 5-8 g/L. The wine has been produced since 1978.

Red
Apsny is a naturally semi-sweet red wine made of red grape varieties cultivated in Abkhazia. The wine of pomegranate colour has a pleasant aroma, a full and harmonious taste with gentle sweetness. When ready for use, the wine contains 9-10% alcohol, 3-5% sugar and has 5-7% titrated acidity. At an international exhibition the wine received one silver medal.
Lykhny is a naturally semi-sweet red wine made of the Izabela grape variety cultivated in Abkhazia. The wine has red colour, a specific aroma and a fresh harmonious taste. The wine contains about 10% alcohol, 3-5% sugar and has 5-7% titrated acidity. At international exhibitions Lykhny was awarded one silver and one bronze medal.

See also

Georgian wine

References

External links
Abkhazian wine 

Abkhazia